The Port of Tokyo is one of the largest Japanese seaports and one of the largest seaports in the Pacific Ocean basin having an annual traffic capacity of around 100 million tonnes of cargo and 4,500,000 twenty-foot equivalent units.

The port is also an important employer in the area having more than 30,000 employees that provide services to more than 32,000 ships every year.

History
The forerunner of the Port of Tokyo, the Edo Port (Edo Minato) played a very important role in the history of marine transport of Japan and as a distribution point for supplying goods for the people of Edo. During the Tokugawa Shogunate the Port of Tokyo was not allowed to open to international trade, although the neighbouring Port of Yokohama was already open for this kind of trade.

The development of the port was finally encouraged during the Meiji Period with the influence of a project that was meant to improve the estuary of the Sumida River by dredging channels and reclaiming land at Tsukishima and Shibaura.

The Kanto earthquake in 1923 served as a starting point of a full-scale terminal construction project, which was topped out with the opening of the first terminal, Hinode, in 1925. Alongside the completion of another two terminals, Shibaura and Takeshiba, the Port of Tokyo opened for international trade on May 20, 1941.

After World War II the development of the port became a vital task for the reconstruction of the Japanese industry, and construction started on the Toyosu coal terminal, the Harumi terminal and other terminals one after another.

By the late 1960s, the container transport system had become a major factor in shipping worldwide. In 1967, Nippon Container Terminals, Ltd. (NCT), became the port's (and Japan's) first container terminal operator. That same year, the first container ship to call on a Japanese port was the first such ship handled by NCT. This significantly contributed to establishing the Port of Tokyo as a major international trade port.

Statistics
In 2007 the Port of Tokyo handled 90,810,000 tonnes of cargo and 3,696,000 twenty-foot equivalent units, making it one of the busiest cargo ports in Japan and one of the largest container ports in the country.

* figures in tonnes

Terminals

Container terminals
The Port of Tokyo has three container terminals with an area of 1,504,718 m2 with a total number of 15 berths and a quay length of 4,479 metres.

Oi container terminal
The terminal has seven berths with an area of 945,700 m2 and a quay length of 2,354 metres.

Aomi container terminal
The terminal has five berths with an area of 479,079 m2 and a quay length of 1,570 metres.

Shinagawa container terminal
The terminal has three berths with an area of 79,939 m2 and a quay length of 333 metres. Opened in 1967 it is the oldest container terminal in Japan.

Kamigumi Tokyo container terminal
The terminal has one berth with a quay length of 260 metres. Private berth by Kamigumi.

Foodstuff terminal
There are two foodstuff terminals opened in February, 1999, Oi marine products and Oi foodstuff, with five berths with a quay length of 1,060 metres and a storage area of 359,000 m2.

General cargo
The general cargo section of the port has five terminals: one for bulk cargo, one for timber, one for construction materials, one for log handling and one for linear products with a storage area of 900,000 m2, a quay length of 3,500 metres, storage for 200,000 cubic metres of timber and storage for 210,000 tonnes of logs.

Automobile terminal
The Port of Tokyo has two RoRo terminal with a total length of 1,200 metres, a land area of 100,000 m2, storage capacity of 22,000 cars and a transshipment capacity of 3,500,000 units per year.

Passenger Ship terminal
Harumi Passenger Ship terminal - International passenger Ship terminal.
 - Domestic passenger Ship terminal.
 - Domestic ferry terminal.

See also
List of East Asian ports
Tokyo Bay

References

Tokyo
Water transport in Tokyo
Economy of Tokyo
Tokyo Bay